is a major music awards show, held annually in Japan that recognizes outstanding achievements in the Japan Composer's Association. Until 2005, the show aired on New Year's Eve, but has since aired every December 30 on TBS Japan at 6:30 P.M JST and is hosted by many announcers.

EXILE holds the record for most wins, with four awards. This is a unique achievement in the Japanese music industry.

Grand Prix shield 
The shield itself, designed by painter Seiji Togo.

Categories 
The Japan Record Awards include, but are not limited to, four awards which are not restricted by genre.

All of the awards would be published in advance, except for the Grand Prix and Best New Artist Award, which would be announced at the ceremony.

Main categories
 New Artist Award - automatically nominates four best new artists for the ‘Best New Artist Award,’ which will select the top debuting artist from the four winners.
 Best New Artist Award - awarded to a performer who releases, during the Eligibility Year, the first recording which establishes the public identity of that artist (which may not necessarily be their first proper release).
 Excellent Work Award - automatically nominates ten artists and songs for the ‘Grand Prix Award,’ which will select the artist and song from the ten winners.
 Grand Prix of Japan Record Award - awarded to the performer and the production team of a single song.

Other categories
 Best Vocal Performance Award - awarded to the best singer.
 Best Album Award - awarded to the performer and the production team of a full album.
 Excellence Album Award 
 Best Composer Award
 Best Arranger Award
 Best Lyricist Award
 Planning Award
 Achievement Award
 Special Award
 Lifetime Achievement Award
 Japan Composer's Association Award

List of Japan Record Award Grand Prix winners

Most wins  
 Including enka and pop artists.
 "Best Composer Award", "Best Arranger Award" and "Best Lyricist Award" are counted to the corresponding recipients rather than the singers.

Most wins in Grand Prix

Most overall wins

Venues 
 1959: Bunkyō Kōkaidō
 1960–1961, 1965: Kanda Kyōritsu Kōdō
 1962–1964, 1966: Hibiya Public Hall
 1967–1968: Shibuya Public Hall
 1969–1984: Imperial Garden Theater
 1985–1993: Nippon Budokan
 1994–2003: TBS Broadcasting Center
 2004–present: New National Theatre

References

External links 
 Japan Composer's Association
 TBS

 
Awards established in 1959
1959 establishments in Japan
Recurring events established in 1959
Annual events in Japan